Jules Séglas (May 31, 1856 – 1939) was a French psychiatrist who practiced medicine at the Bicêtre and Salpêtrière Hospitals in Paris.

Early in his career, he was an assistant to famed neurologist Jean-Martin Charcot (1825–1893). Séglas' ideas and theories influenced a number of psychiatrists, including Henri Ey (1900–1977) and Jacques Lacan (1901–1981). In 1908 he became president of the Societé Medico-Psychologique.

In the field of psychopathology he conducted studies of delusions, hallucinations and pseudohallucinations, providing a detailed nosology of these phenomena. He did extensive research of language and its relationship to mental illness. Here, he described linguistic traits such as logorrhea, embolalia, near-mutism, automatic speech, alexia, agraphia, et al.; and how these behaviors take shape and interact in various psychiatric disorders.

Selected writings 
 L’hallucination dans ses rapports avec la fonction du langage, Progrès médical, 1888.
 Des Troubles du langage chez les Aliénés, Rueff Editeurs, Paris, 1892.
 Leçons cliniques sur les maladies mentales et nerveuses (Salpêtrière (1887–94), Asselin et Houzeau, Paris, 1895
 Le délire de négations, in Du délire des négations aux idées d'énormité, Jules Cotard & autres, L'Harmattan.
 Sémiologie des affections mentales (Semiology of mental disorders), Chap. IV, Book I, 74-270, in Gilbert Ballet's Traité de pathologie mentale.

References
 History of Psychiatry; Jules Séglas
 IDREF.fr (bibliography)

French psychiatrists
1856 births
1939 deaths